PZL.46 Sum (sheatfish) was a light bomber of the Polish Air Force before World War II, which,
was directed to serial production in the spring of 1939. These planes were in production, but the Polish industry did not manage to produce them before the outbreak of the war.

Design and development
The PZL.46 Sum was designed by Stanisław Prauss in the PZL works as a successor to the standard Polish light bomber and reconnaissance plane, the PZL.23 Karaś, also of Prauss' design.  First sketches were made in 1936.  In order to test new features, like double tail fins and a retractable underbelly bombardier gondola, a single modified PZL.23, designated PZL.42 was built and tested in 1936.

The first prototype of PZL.46 Sum flew in August 1938.  It shared only a general composition with Karaś, its fuselage was much more aerodynamically refined and its wings had thinner profile.  Initially it was intended to use retractable landing gear, but since the Polish industry did not produce retractable landing gear, a fixed one was used.  In November–December 1938 the prototype was shown at the Paris Air Show.  In May 1939 the second similar prototype was flown (PZL.46/II).

Tests proved, that the Sum was a successful design, with much better performance, than Karaś.  The only major faults were with a mechanism of retracting of the underbelly gondola (the gondola for a bombardier, with a machine gun at the rear, was a feature copied from Karaś, where it was a fixed one.  It was a rare feature in light bombers' construction and its usefulness was questionable, as it reduced performance).

In March 1939 the PZL.46 was ordered for a serial production.  The Polish Air Force planned to buy 160 aircraft of the PZL.46A variant. The first aircraft were to be completed in autumn 1939 and delivered in early 1940.  Only some parts were produced by the German invasion of Poland in September 1939.

The third prototype was in construction in the summer of 1939, it was to be an export variant PZL.46B, powered with Gnome-Rhône 14N21 engine.  Bulgaria, using PZL.43 Karaś bombers, showed an interest in the new design and made a preliminary order for 12 aircraft, uncompleted due to war.

Stanisław Prauss made also a preliminary design of smaller development variant PZL Łosoś, which was to be a two-seater dive  bomber with  Hispano-Suiza 12Z inline engine and retractable landing gear, without underbelly gondola.

Technical description 
The aircraft was conventional in layout, mid-wing all-metal cantilever monoplane, metal-covered.  The fuselage was semi-monocoque, oval in cross-section. Double tail fins.  The crew consisted of three: pilot, observer/bombardier and rear gunner.  The bombardier's combat station was in a gondola underneath the fuselage, where he also operated an underbelly machine gun.  The gondola could be retracted into the fuselage to decrease drag. 
The fixed undercarriage had aerodynamic teardrop covers. Radial engine, PZL-built 840 hp Bristol Pegasus (PZL Pegaz) XXB (maximum power 940 hp), in a NACA-style cowling.  Three-blade metal propeller Hamilton Standard. Fuel tanks: 750 L in a central wing section.

Operational history
During World War II, the first prototype was left in Warsaw, because of a landing gear damage.  On 5 September 1939 the second prototype was evacuated from Warsaw to Lwów, then on 17 September to Bucharest in Romania, where it was interned.  On 26 September 1939, under pretext of delivering the plane to IAR factory in Brasov, it was flown by Riess with other three crewmen (including Witold Urbanowicz) from Romania to besieged Warsaw.  The crew delivered orders from the Polish C-in-C Edward Rydz-Śmigły for the commander of Warsaw defence Juliusz Rómmel.  On 27 September 1939, with most of the Polish territory occupied by Germans or Soviets, it flew to Kaunas in Lithuania.  The plane was interned and left there and later captured there and tested by the Soviets.

Variants
PZL.46/I
First prototype.
PZL.46/II
Second prototype.
PZL.46A
Main production version, 160 ordered for Polish Air Force, none delivered.
PZL.46B
Export version powered Gnome-Rhône 14N21 engine.

Operators

Bulgarian Air Force preliminarily ordered 12 aircraft, none delivered.

Polish Air Force

Soviet Air Force operated one captured prototype for evaluation.

Specifications (P.46/I)

See also

References 

 Andrzej Glass: "Polskie konstrukcje lotnicze 1893-1939" (Polish aviation constructions 1893-1939), WKiŁ, Warsaw 1977 (Polish language, no ISBN)

External links 

  PZL-46 Sum with photos and drawings (translated page from Ugolok Neba)

1930s Polish bomber aircraft
1930s Polish military reconnaissance aircraft
World War II Polish light bombers
PZL aircraft
Single-engined tractor aircraft
Mid-wing aircraft
Aircraft first flown in 1938